Mussington is a surname. Notable people with the name include:

 Ian Mussington (born 1967), American musician
 Louis Mussington, French politician

See also
 Thrussington